Gouékan is a town in the far west of Ivory Coast. It is a sub-prefecture of Ouaninou Department in Bafing Region, Woroba District.

Gouékan was a commune until March 2012, when it became one of 1126 communes nationwide that were abolished.
In 2014, the population of the sub-prefecture of Gouékan was 3,246.

Villages
The eight villages of the sub-prefecture of Gouékan and their population in 2014 are:
 Gbédéma (648)
 Gouékan (723)
 N'gohisso (196)
 Oualou-Gouékan (550)
 Sodiman (239)
 Sougouékan (203)
 Toubako-Gouékan (196)
 Vayasso (491)

Notes

Sub-prefectures of Bafing Region
Former communes of Ivory Coast